Camp Cope is the self-titled debut studio album by Australian alternative rock trio Camp Cope. The album was released on 22 April 2016 through Poison City Records and debuted and peaked at number 36 on the ARIA Charts.It was nominated for the Australian Music Prize and Australian Album of the Year at the J Awards of 2016.

Background 

Camp Cope was released by the Australian alternative rock group of the same name on 22 April 2016 via the independent label, Poison City. The power trio had formed in 2015 in Melbourne by Kelly-Dawn Hellmrich on bass guitar, Georgia "Georgia Maq" McDonald on lead vocals and guitar and Sarah "Thomo" Thompson on drums. The album peaked at No. 36 on the ARIA Albums chart. It was produced by Sam Johnson at Holes & Corners Studios, Melbourne.

Camp Cope was nominated for the  Australian Music Prize and Australian Album of the Year at the J Awards of 2016.

Track listing

Charts

Release history

References

2016 debut albums
Camp Cope albums